How Mill was a railway station which served the village of The How, near Brampton in Cumbria. The station was closed in 1959, four years before the Beeching Axe.

The How was on one side of the station, almost a mile away, while the Mill was on the other side. The Mill was a sawmill and a house where the family lived who own the Mill. A level crossing was in place in the early 1940s.

References

External links

Disused railway stations in Cumbria
Former North Eastern Railway (UK) stations
Railway stations in Great Britain opened in 1836
Railway stations in Great Britain closed in 1959
Hayton, Carlisle